The 2021 PDC Women's Series consisted of 12 darts tournaments on the 2021 PDC Pro Tour.

After originally planned to be held over 3 weekends with the first weekend of 4 events being held in Niedernhausen, Germany, the second weekend being held in Milton Keynes, and the third weekend in Barnsley. However, due to a lack of interest in the German events, the 12 events were reformatted into 2 weekends of 6 events, with each Saturday and Sunday having 3 events in each. So, instead the winners of Events 1–6 and Events 7–12 each received a spot at the 2021 Grand Slam of Darts.

The top 2 on the rankings after all 12 events qualified for the 2022 PDC World Darts Championship.

Prize money
The prize money for the Women's Series events remained the same from 2020, with each event having a prize fund of £5,000.

This is how the prize money was divided:

September

Women's Series 1
Women's Series 1 was contested on Saturday 25 September 2021 at the Marshall Arena in Milton Keynes.

Women's Series 2
Women's Series 2 was contested on Saturday 25 September 2021 at the Marshall Arena in Milton Keynes.

Women's Series 3
Women's Series 3 was contested on Saturday 25 September 2021 at the Marshall Arena in Milton Keynes.

Women's Series 4
Women's Series 4 was contested on Sunday 26 September 2021 at the Marshall Arena in Milton Keynes.

Women's Series 5
Women's Series 5 was contested on Sunday 26 September 2021 at the Marshall Arena in Milton Keynes.

Women's Series 6
Women's Series 6 was contested on Sunday 26 September 2021 at the Marshall Arena in Milton Keynes.

October

Women's Series 7
Women's Series 7 was contested on Saturday 23 October 2021 at the Barnsley Metrodome in Barnsley.

Women's Series 8
Women's Series 8 was contested on Saturday 23 October 2021 at the Barnsley Metrodome in Barnsley.

Women's Series 9
Women's Series 9 was contested on Saturday 23 October 2021 at the Barnsley Metrodome in Barnsley.

Women's Series 10
Women's Series 10 was contested on Sunday 24 October 2021 at the Barnsley Metrodome in Barnsley.

Women's Series 11
Women's Series 11 was contested on Sunday 24 October 2021 at the Barnsley Metrodome in Barnsley.

Women's Series 12
Women's Series 12 was contested on Sunday 24 October 2021 at the Barnsley Metrodome in Barnsley.

References

2021 in darts
2021 PDC Pro Tour